Blaydon is a town in the Metropolitan Borough of Gateshead, Tyne and Wear, England, and historically in County Durham. Blaydon, and neighbouring Winlaton, which Blaydon is now contiguous with, form the postal town of Blaydon-on-Tyne. The Blaydon/Winlaton resident population in 2011 was 13,896.

Between 1894 and 1974, Blaydon was an urban district which extended inland from the Tyne along the River Derwent for ten miles (16 km), and included the mining communities of Chopwell and High Spen, the villages of Rowlands Gill, Blackhall Mill, Barlow, Winlaton Mill and Stella, as well as Blaydon and Winlaton. During its existence, the Urban District's fourteen and a half square miles constituted the second largest administrative district by area, on Tyneside, after Newcastle upon Tyne.

History

The town of Blaydon is essentially an industrial area and is not more than two centuries old. Indeed, in the 1760s there was little here but a few farms and cottages. In the latter part of the same century a smelting works was set up from which sprang the industrial growth of the area.

Though the town itself has a relatively short history there has been activity in the area for many centuries.

Early history

The earliest recorded evidence of human activity at Blaydon is a Neolithic polished stone axe found in the early 20th century. Finds and structures from later prehistoric periods include a bronze spearhead and log-boat, both recovered from the River Tyne in the 19th century. A number of Bronze Age cists are recorded from Summerhill and several others from Bewes Hill.

Little is recorded of medieval Blaydon, which appears to have been based upon the modern farm sites of High and Low Shibdon. The Blaydon Burn Belts Corn Mill, part of a row of 5 or 6 water corn mills stretching from Brockwell Wood to the River Tyne is known to have been present by the early 17th century, suggesting a healthy population at that time. It is likely that, as well as farming, many industrial activities such as mining and quarrying had begun in the medieval and post-medieval periods, well before the industrial period of the 18th to 20th centuries when Blaydon became an important industrial centre.

Battle of Stella Ford

Also known as the Battle of Newburn or Newburn Ford, this relatively unknown battle has recently been elevated in importance by English Heritage. On 28 August 1640, 20,000 Scots defeated 5,500 English soldiers who were defending the ford over the Tyne four miles (6 km) west of Newcastle. The Scots had been provoked by Charles I, who had imposed bishops and a foreign prayer book on their church. The Scots army, led by Alexander Leslie, fought its way to Newcastle and occupied the city for almost a year before Charles I paid it £200,000 to depart. The battle brought to an end the so-called 'Eleven Years of Tyranny' by forcing Charles to recall Parliament.

The 18th century and the Industrial Revolution

The stimulus for industry at Blaydon and Blaydon burn, as elsewhere in the region, was the growth in coal mining and the coal trade, particularly from the early 18th century, when the Hazard and Speculation pits were established at Low Shibdon linked to the Tyne by wagonways. The 18th century Blaydon Main Colliery was reopened in the mid-19th century and worked until 1921. Other pits and associated features included Blaydon Burn Colliery, Freehold pit and the Blaydonburn wagonway. Industries supported by the coal trade included chemical works, bottle works, sanitary pipe works, lampblack works, an ironworks, a smithy and brickworks - Cowen's Upper and Lower Brickworks were established in 1730 and were associated with a variety of features including a clay drift mine and coal/clay drops. The Lower works remains in operation. Blaydon Burn Coke Ovens, also of 19th-century origin, were replaced in the 1930s by Priestman Ottovale Coke and Tar Works which was the first in the world to produce petrol from coal known as Blaydon Benzole.

In addition to the workers' housing developments associated with industrialisation, a number of grand residences were constructed for industrialists in the area, such as Blaydon Burn House, home of Joseph Cowen, owner of the brickworks. Ironically, the remains of Old Dockendale Hall, an earlier grand residence (or perhaps a superior farmhouse) of 17th century or earlier construction, was destroyed when the coke and tar works was built at Blaydon Burn.

Blaydon School Press

In the 1930s, pupils at the now demolished Blaydon Intermediate School, under the leadership of English teacher Mr Elliott and art teacher Mr Boyce, gradually developed a technique for producing hardback books. Their productions were highly respected and favourably compared to other successful private printing presses of the time. In one volume produced by the school in 1935, entitled "Songs of Enchantment", the pupils were successful in convincing the famous poet Walter de la Mare to write a foreword in which he praised their enterprise and efforts.

Stella South Power Station

The post war era of the late 40s and 50s saw a rapid rise in demand for electricity and, in the North East, the extension of existing and construction of a number of new power stations was seen as a key part of the solution. For the Blaydon area, this meant the arrival of a new power station at Stella Haugh, known as the South Stella Power Station, which helped to meet the energy demands of the North East until its closure in 1991. It was demolished in 1992.

Governance

The House of Commons constituency seat of Blaydon is held by MP Liz Twist.

The area has traditionally been a Labour stronghold and has been held by the Labour Party since 1935. The Labour candidate David Anderson received 51.5% of the vote in 2005, with the Liberal Democrat candidate, Peter Maughan, second at 37.9%.

Blaydon ward elects three councillors to Gateshead Council. They are Malcolm Brain, Lee-Ann Moir and Steve Ronchetti (all Labour).

Geography

Modern Blaydon stands close to the Tyne with the A695, a key road from Gateshead to Hexham, passing through the town centre. Between this main road and the river is the railway and, beyond it, in a bend of the Tyne is the industrial district of Blaydon Haughs. The main part of the town lies south of the railway.

Despite being a largely urban and industrial town, there are various rural aspects to Blaydon and the surrounding area. Between High Spen and Chopwell are large Forestry Commission woods and these and other forested areas extend down the hillside to the Derwent river which lies on the east and forms the urban district boundary.

The area is also home to Shibdon Pond at the former site of Blaydon Main Colliery. Shibdon Pond is a nature reserve situated at the Eastern end of the town. Many species of waterfowl live on the pond and surrounding marshland, and a hide is available for ornithologists. English Nature has designated Shibdon Pond as one of Tyne and Wear's Sites of Special Scientific Interest (SSSIs). The subject of a regeneration campaign, Shibdon Dene (sometimes inaccurately called 'Blaydon Dene') is another recreational area consisting of a pathway between a great number of fine trees.

There is also a nature reserve towards the border of Winlaton at "Blaydon Burn", mentioned earlier for mining. The burn is now a popular walking/cycling track for locals which occupies a disused railway line, the tracks of which have long since been removed. However, portions of buildings and platforms still remain. The track is roughly a mile-and-a-half long and ends near the Path Head Watermill.

Blaydon contains the following districts, some of them have been swallowed up by urban sprawl.

 Blaydon town centre
 Blaydon Haughs
 South Blaydon (Winlaton)
 Axwell Park
 Shibdon

Stella and Winlaton Mill are outer suburbs of the town, as they are not within Blaydon's boundaries but are nearby.

Demography
Blaydon had a population of 15,155 in the 2011 census, which increased from 14,648 a decade earlier.

Economy

Once the powerhouse of the Industrial Revolution in Gateshead, Blaydon's traditional industry was coal mining. However, since the decline of mining in the 1950s and 1960s, the economy has diversified. As well as a small number of commuting professionals, residents of Blaydon are often involved in engineering and manufacturing with many businesses operating from premises in Blaydon Haughs (or 'The Spike'), on the banks of the River Tyne.

Blaydon was for a time the head office of Associated Cooperative Creameries (later renamed ACC then ACC Milk). ACC Milk was sold to Dairy Farmers of Britain in 2004. On 3 June 2009, Dairy Farmers of Britain went into receivership and the dairy in Chainbridge Road closed shortly afterwards with the loss of 300 jobs. In 2010 the dairy was acquired by Medina Dairies and reopened, but closed again just a year later.

Blaydon has a shopping centre, known locally as the precinct. A brutalist 1970s creation, it contains the town's major shops including newsagents, Greggs, Costa, Iceland (supermarket), B & M, Blaydon Carpets and Furnishings, Ladbrokes, Superdrug, Boots (chemist), Boyes and, at the nearby car park, a McDonald's. There are also several food and grocery outlets. The precinct underwent redevelopment in 2012–2014, with the installation of a lift, and the demolition of the Geordie Ridley pub to make way for a new Morrison's supermarket, a new day-centre and doctors' surgery, and roof-top parking. There is also a Co-op Funeralcare just outside the precinct on Bridge street.

The area underwent a significant programme of housing regeneration between 2009 and 2014 with new developments in progress at High View on the Winlaton-Blaydon border, by the riverside on the site of the former Stella South power station and at Axwell Gardens, near to the existing Axwell Park estate.

Landmarks

Stella Hall

Stella Hall was a large building, essentially Elizabethan in character, but with an 18th-century south front. Older sections showed mullioned windows and other Elizabethan architectural features whilst the 18th century windows and south front were the work of the architect James Paine, designer of Axwell Hall on the other side of the district. The Hall, Drawing Room and library were of Paine's design but the former Roman Catholic Chapel was older.

Stella Hall has had a long history that goes back as far as 1143 when there was a nunnery on this site. The present house was built by the Tempest family, Newcastle merchants. They occupied Stella Hall for 150 years and then in 1700 it passed into the ownership (by marriage) of Lord Widdrington, a noted Jacobite. Widdrington, on 6 October 1715, invited his friends and tenants to breakfast at the hall and, after toasting the Stuarts, they all set off to join the Earl of Derwentwater and his rebels. The uprising failed and Widdrington was sentenced to death though he was later reprieved and his estate and house restored to him.

In later years Garibaldi and Kossuth were among the famous people who were entertained at Stella Hall. A statue of Garibaldi was discovered some years ago in the garden of a house on the estate and the head can now be found in the entrance lobby of Blaydon library. In more modern times the hall became the home of Joseph Cowen, M.P. and owner of the Newcastle Daily Chronicle who died in 1900. The last member of this family, Jane Cowen, died in 1948 and the house was demolished in 1953.

The remaining parts of Stella Hall, now known as Stella Hall Cottage, is a listed building.

Axwell Hall

On the west of the town and a mile inland from the Tyne is Axwell Park, once the home of the Clavering family. Axwell Hall (also Axwell House) is a Grade II* listed mansion, built for Sir Thomas Clavering by the noted architect James Paine and completed in 1761. The last (10th) baronet died in 1893 and Axwell Hall later found use as a prisoner-of-war camp during the second world war and later as an approved school. Much of the park has been developed for residential purposes and the hall itself was, after two decades of decay, restored. There are plans to convert it to residential apartments.

Transport

Air

Rail
Historically, Blaydon was a major railway hub for both passenger and freight services. The area occupied an important geographical position in relation to Newcastle upon Tyne, which could be reached using the Scotswood Railway Bridge. Blaydon served as the eastern terminus of the Newcastle and Carlisle Railway, following the opening of the first section of the line in March 1835.

Blaydon is served by the Tyne Valley Line, with services currently operated by Northern Trains. After a number of years of limited service, 2014 saw the restoration of a much-improved timetable. As of the December 2019 timetable change, there is generally an hourly service between Newcastle and Hexham, with some additional trains stopping during peak times.

Road
Blaydon is linked to Newcastle upon Tyne and the A1 to the east, by the A695, which used to pass through the centre of the town. The A695 road now bypasses the town centre to the north.

Blaydon Bus Station

Blaydon Bus Station is served predominantly by Go North East's local bus services, with frequent routes running in and around Gateshead and Newcastle upon Tyne, as well as Northumberland and the Tyne Valley.

In 2009, the bus station was refurbished, at a cost of around £100,000. The refurbishment saw the installation of new shelters at each of its four stands, upgraded lighting systems, and the addition of real-time information systems.

As of June 2020, the stand allocation is:

Education

Blaydon is part of the Gateshead Local Education Authority. It is home to a number of primary schools (both faith and secular schools) including Blaydon West primary and St Joseph's, a Roman Catholic primary school. It also has St Thomas More Catholic School, a high achieving Roman Catholic secondary school which serves the Roman Catholic population of the western part of Gateshead borough.

Religious sites
Blaydon has several churches. 
In Blaydon town centre, St Cuthbert's (Church of England) (opened in 1845) and St Joseph's (Roman Catholic) (opened in 1905 on the site of an earlier church) are situated opposite each other, on either side of Shibdon Road. Both are impressive structures, and the interiors still reflect the style of architecture used in their construction. Also on Shibdon Road, at the corner with Lucy Street and opposite the entrance to the roof-top car park above Morrisons, is Trinity Methodist Church.

There is also a Catholic church in Stella (St Mary and Thomas Aquinas, opened 1835) .

A brand new Kingdom Hall of Jehovah's Witnesses was opened in 2013, near Cowen Road. This was, remarkably, built by voluntary labour as Witnesses from all over the North-East donned hard hats and work gear, working under the supervision of professional builders.

In Winlaton, the parish church of Winlaton opened in 1828, the Congregational church in 1829, and the Wesleyan Chapel in 1868. The latter two united to form Winlaton United Reformed-Methodist Church, but this closed in August 2015, with some members moving to join Trinity Methodist Church in Blaydon. The Primitive Methodists had opened a building in 1850, which was extended in 1895, and was later to become the Blaydon Corps of the Salvation Army; this corps closed in September 2012. St Anne's Catholic Church in Winlaton was opened in 1962.

Sports

The Blaydon area is the origin of the well-known traditional song "Blaydon Races", written by local musician and showman George 'Geordie' Ridley in 1862. The town's athletic club - the Blaydon Harriers - organise a road running race (called the Blaydon Race) every year on 9 June. The route of the race follows the route outlined by Ridley in his song. The traditional starting point lies outside Balmbra's pub in Newcastle's Bigg Market, and the race follows a course along Scotswood Road before crossing the River Tyne and ultimately finishing in Blaydon town centre. Local councillors, societies and notaries have in recent years organised an annual Blaydon Festival with music, sport and arts events that coincides with the week of race day.

As well as the Blaydon races, The Blaydon Harriers organise regular race meetings on the Shibdon Pond fields (and other venues) throughout the year. These are usually well-attended both by participants and spectators. The Harriers' colours are orange and black.

The rugby union club, Blaydon RFC play in the English National League 2 North, the fourth tier of the English rugby union system and a high level considering the size of the town. The Crow Trees rugby ground is situated to the east of the town, in neighbouring Swalwell. Blaydon RFC play in red shirts and white shorts. The former England international Mick Skinner played for Blaydon. Their smaller but no less illustrious neighbours, Winlaton Vulcans RFC play in Durham and Northumberland Division 2 and number Ken Goodall, the former Ireland and British Lion International, as one of their former players. They play in black shirts, shorts and socks with the club badge of an arm gripping a hammer over an anvil depicting their heritage being formed from the steelworking heritage of the area.

Since 2013 Blaydon has also been host to Blaydon Cycle Club, meeting weekly and throughout the week catering from novice cyclists right through to having a race team competing in local and national events.

Notable people
 Alun Armstrong, former professional footballer with Ipswich Town F.C. and Middlesbrough FC
 Peter Armstrong, the poet and psychotherapist, was born in Blaydon.
 Sir Thomas Clavering, 7th Baronet, owner of Axwell Hall
 Joseph Cowen, 19th century politician and journalist
 Graham Onions, Durham and English cricketer
 Bert Tulloch, former professional footballer with Blackpool
 Gavin Webster, stand-up comedian
 William Widdrington, 4th Baron Widdrington, owner of Stella Hall

Culture

Live jazz and rock music is regularly performed at the Black Bull pub near Blaydon Bridge. Although many pubs were demolished during the refurbishment of the town in the 1970s, a number of pubs still exist in and around the precinct, along with the Staffs (formerly the Railway Staff Club). The Blaydon and District Social Club - a former working men's club - and the Blaydon House Sports and Social Club (formerly the Conservative Club), which occupied the house of the nineteenth-century Doctor Morrison, and was reputedly the oldest building in Blaydon, were both demolished in 2020–2021 to make way for housing. The façade of Blaydon House was incorporated into a new building. The Masonic Hall on Blaydon Bank was closed in 2015, with Lodge meetings transferring to Ryton Masonic Hall.

See also
Ottovale coke works

References

External links

 Video and pictures of Blaydon

Towns in Tyne and Wear
Unparished areas in Tyne and Wear
Former civil parishes in Tyne and Wear
Gateshead